Alfalfa is an unincorporated residential village in western Caddo County, Oklahoma, United States. Fort Cobb Lake and state park are approximately five miles to the east.

The community was originally named "Boise," however, it was later changed to "Alfalfa" to avoid confusion with Boise City, Oklahoma. The community was so named on account of alfalfa fields near the original town site.

References

Unincorporated communities in Caddo County, Oklahoma
Unincorporated communities in Oklahoma